The 2nd Asian Winter Games were held from March 9 to 14, 1990, in Sapporo, Hokkaidō, Japan.  India was originally scheduled to host the second edition of the games, but due to technical and financial difficulties it gave up its hosting rights to Japan in 1989. The 2nd Winter Asiad saw three NOCs participating in the games for the first time: Chinese Taipei, Iran and the Philippines.

Sports
Events from only six sports were held in the Second Winter Asiad. Figure skating was temporarily out due to conflict with the 1990 World Figure Skating Championships, while Large-hill (90m) Ski Jumping was again a demonstration sport.
 
 
 
 
 
 

Demonstration sports

Participating nations
Teams from Iran, Chinese Taipei and the Philippines made their debut at the event, which had a total of over three hundred athletes entering from nine nations.

Non-competing nations
Hong Kong, which had sent a delegation of figure skaters to the last games, this time sent only officials.

Medal table

References

 
A
Asian
Asian Winter Games
Asian Winter Games
Asian Games
Multi-sport events in Japan
Sports competitions in Sapporo
March 1990 sports events in Asia
20th century in Sapporo